Jessica Jones is a Marvel Comics character.

Jessica Jones may also refer to:

 Jessica Jones (comic book), comic book series
 Jessica Jones (EastEnders), character in EastEnders
 Jessica Jones (Marvel Cinematic Universe)
 Jessica Jones (TV series), a television series based on the Marvel character
 Jessica Leigh Jones (born 1994), Welsh engineer and astrophysicist
 Jess Jones (born 1990), Canadian women's ice hockey player

See also
Jesse Jones (disambiguation)